The Dornier Do X was the largest, heaviest, and most powerful flying boat in the world when it was produced by the Dornier company of Germany in 1929. First conceived by Claude Dornier in 1924, planning started in late 1925 and after over 240,000 work-hours it was completed in June 1929.

During the years between the two World Wars, only the Soviet Tupolev ANT-20 Maksim Gorki landplane of a few years later was physically larger, but at 53 metric tonnes maximum takeoff weight it was not as heavy as the Do X's 56 tonnes.

The Do X was financed by the German Transport Ministry and in order to circumvent conditions of the Treaty of Versailles, which forbade any aircraft exceeding set speed and range limits to be built by Germany after World War I, a specially designed plant was built at Altenrhein, on the Swiss side of Lake Constance.

The type was popular with the public, but a lack of commercial interest and a number of non-fatal accidents prevented more than three examples from being built.

Design

The Do X was a semi-cantilever monoplane. The Do X had an all-duralumin hull, with wings composed of a steel-reinforced duralumin framework covered in heavy linen fabric, covered with aluminium paint.

It was initially powered by twelve  Siemens-built Bristol Jupiter radial engines in tandem push-pull configuration mountings, with six tractor propellers and six pushers mounted on six strut-mounted nacelles above the wing. The nacelles were joined by an auxiliary wing to stabilise the mountings. The engines were managed by a flight engineer, who controlled the 12 throttles and monitored the 12 sets of gauges. The pilot would relay a request to the engineer to adjust the power setting, in a manner similar to the system used on maritime vessels, using an engine order telegraph. Many aspects of the aircraft echoed nautical arrangements of the time, including the flight deck, which bore a strong resemblance to the bridge of a vessel. After completing 103 flights in 1930, the Do X was refitted with  Curtiss V-1570 "Conqueror" water-cooled V-12 engines. Only then was it able to reach the altitude of  necessary to cross the Atlantic. Dornier designed the flying boat to carry 66 passengers on long-distance flights or 100 passengers on short flights.

The luxurious passenger accommodation approached the standards of transatlantic liners. There were three decks. On the main deck was a smoking room with its own wet bar, a dining salon, and seating for the 66 passengers which could also be converted to sleeping berths for night flights. Aft of the passenger spaces was an all-electric galley, lavatories, and cargo hold. The cockpit, navigational office, engine control and radio rooms were on the upper deck. The lower deck held fuel tanks and nine watertight compartments, only seven of which were needed to provide full flotation. Similar to the later Boeing 314, the Do X lacked conventional wing floats, instead using fuselage mounted "stub wings" to stabilise the craft in the water, which also doubled as embarkation platforms for passengers.

Three Do Xs were constructed in total. The original operated by Dornier, and two other machines based on orders from Italy. The X2, named Umberto Maddalena (registered I-REDI), and X3, named Alessandro Guidoni (registered I-ABBN). The Italian variants were slightly larger and used a different powerplant and engine mounts. Dornier claimed the X2 was the largest aircraft in the world at that time. Each was powered by Fiat A-22R  V12 water-cooled engines, with the six engine mounts being covered by a streamlined fairing.

A proposed improved version of the Do X designated the Dornier Do 20, in which the pylon-mounted engines were to be replaced by four pairs of  diesel engines in nacelles fared into the wing's leading edge and driving four propellers, was promoted in 1936, but never advanced beyond a design study.

Operation

The Flugschiff ("flying ship"), as it was called, was launched for its first test flight on 12 July 1929, with a crew of 14. To satisfy skeptics, on its 70th test flight on 21 October there were 169 on board of which 150 were passengers (mostly production workers and their families, and a few journalists), ten were aircrew and nine were stowaways. The flight set a new world record for the number of people carried on a single flight, a record that would stand for 20 years. Passengers were asked to crowd together on one side or the other to help make turns. It flew for 40 minutes Flug Revue claims it was the 42nd flight and lasted 53 minutes, and a historical film shows "") at a maximum speed of  before landing on Lake Constance.

To introduce the airliner to the potential United States market the Do X took off from Friedrichshafen, Germany, on 3 November 1930, under the command of Friedrich Christiansen for a transatlantic test flight to New York. The route took the Do X to the Netherlands, the United Kingdom, France, Spain, and Portugal. The journey was interrupted at Lisbon on 29 November, when a tarpaulin made contact with a hot exhaust pipe and started a fire that consumed most of the left wing. After sitting in Lisbon harbour for six weeks while new parts were fabricated and the damage repaired, the flying boat continued with several further mishaps and delays along the Western coast of Africa and by 5 June 1931 had reached the islands of Cape Verde, from which it crossed the ocean to Natal in Brazil.

The flight continued north via San Juan to the United States, reaching New York on 27 August 1931, almost ten months after departing Friedrichshafen. The Do X and crew spent the next nine months there as its engines were overhauled, and thousands of sightseers made the trip to Glenn Curtiss Airport (now LaGuardia) for sightseeing tours. The Great Depression dashed Dornier's marketing plans for the Do X, and it departed from New York on 21 May 1932 via Newfoundland and the Azores to Müggelsee, Berlin, where it arrived on 24 May and was met by a cheering crowd of 200,000.

The Do X2 entered service in August 1931, and the X3 followed in May 1932. Both were initially based at the seaplane station at La Spezia, on the Ligurian Sea, and reassigned to various other bases during their service.
Both orders originated with SANA, then the Italian state airline, but were requisitioned and used by the Italian Air Force primarily for prestige flights and public spectacles. After plans for a first-class passenger service (Genoa–Gibraltar) were deemed unfeasible, the X2 and X3 were used for officer training cruises, aeronaval manoeuvres, and publicity flights.

In April 1936, a plan was floated for a trans-Atlantic service between Berlin and New York via Lisbon and Charleston, South Carolina, with intermediate stops in the Azores and Bermuda, but it never came to pass.

Final fates

Germany's original Do X was turned over to Deutsche Luft Hansa, the German national airline, after the financially strapped Dornier company could no longer operate it. After a successful 1932 tour of German coastal cities, Luft Hansa planned a Do X flight to Vienna, Budapest, and Istanbul for 1933. The voyage ended after nine days when the flying boat's tail section tore off during a botched, overly-steep landing on a reservoir lake near Passau. While the accident was successfully covered up, the Do X was out of service for three years, during which time it changed hands several times before reappearing in 1936 in Berlin, Hormann writes "Am 5.September 1933 flog Chefeinflieger Wagner die DO-X zum Bodensee zurück. Mit dem Fiasko von Passau begann für DO-X der Weg ins Museum." ("On 5 September 1933 chief test pilot Wagner flew the DO X back to the Bodensee (Lake Constance). The Passau fiasco started the DO X's trip to the museum.") The Do X then became the centerpiece of Germany's new aviation museum Deutsche Luftfahrt-Sammlung at Lehrter Bahnhof.

The Do X remained an exhibit until being destroyed during World War II in a Royal Air Force air raid on the night of 23–24 November 1943. Fragments of the torn-off tail section are displayed at the Dornier Museum in Friedrichshafen. While never a commercial success, the Dornier Do X was the largest heavier-than-air aircraft of its time, and demonstrated the potential of an international passenger air service.

In an accident identical to that of Lufthansa's Do X1a, the Italian Do X2 lost its tail section in a botched landing only one month later. After scaling back flights and crew complements during 1934, they were mothballed at Marina di Pisa in 1935, and broken up for scrap in 1937.

Operators

 Dornier Flugzeugwerke
 Deutsche Luft Hansa

 Regia Aeronautica
 SANA (state airline)

Specifications (Do X1a)

See also

Further reading 
 Volker A. Behr: Dornier Do X.  Motorbuch Verlag, Stuttgart 2011, ISBN 978-3-613-03329-0.
 Claude Dornier: Aus meiner Ingenieurlaufbahn. Eigenverlag, Zug 1966, (Privatdruck).

 Jörg-Michael Hormann: Flugschiff DO-X. Die Chronik. Delius Klasing, Bielefeld 2006, ISBN 3-7688-1841-1.
 Jörg-Michael Hormann: Ein Schiff fliegt in die Welt. 75 Jahre Dornier-Flugschiff Do X D-1929. Deutsche Post AG, Bonn 2004, ISBN 3-00-014367-X.
 Brigitte Katzwandel-Drews: Claude Dornier. Pionier der Luftfahrt. Klasing, Bielefeld 2007, ISBN 978-3-7688-1970-1.
 Peter Pletschacher: Grossflugschiff Dornier Do X. Authentische Bilddokumentation des ersten Großraumflugzeugs der Welt, 1929. 3. Auflage. Aviatic-Verlag, Oberhaching 1997, ISBN 3-925505-38-5 (enthält auch Informationen zur Do X2 und Do X3).
 Fritz Strauß: Auf gefahrvollem Flug. Abenteuerlicher Studienflug, der neben spannenden Erlebnissen eine Reihe wissenschaftlicher Erklärungen bietet, die das Interesse für diese Gebiete wecken. Loewe, Stuttgart 1932.
 Jörg-Michael Hormann: Warum Schiffe fliegen mussten. Beginn des Transatlantikluftverkehrs. In: Schiff Classic. Magazin für Schifffahrts- und Marinegeschichte, H. 1, 2013, S. 48–55.
 Dornier GmbH Friedrichshafen Abt. PR, 799 Friedrichshafen Do X 1929 / Mit dem ersten Flugschiff Dornier Do X D 1929 über drei Kontinente Jubiläumsschrift; Doppelbuchband von Januar 1979.
 Do X – das größte Flugschiff der Welt. 73 Bilder, eingeleitet von Claudius Dornier, erläutert von Erich Tilgenkamp. Schaubücher 41. Zürich: Orell Füssli, 1931

Notes

References

Works cited

External links

 A flight aboard the DoX - 1930 (3:03)

 lufthansa dornier dox
 Dornier DO-X over Amsterdam - 1930

Do X
1920s German airliners
Flying boats
Twelve-engined push-pull aircraft
High-wing aircraft
Engine-over-wing aircraft
Aircraft first flown in 1929